In enzymology, a zeatin O-beta-D-xylosyltransferase is an enzyme that catalyzes the chemical reaction

UDP-D-xylose + zeatin  UDP + O-beta-D-xylosylzeatin

Thus, the two substrates of this enzyme are UDP-D-xylose and zeatin, whereas its two products are UDP and O-beta-D-xylosylzeatin.

This enzyme belongs to the family of glycosyltransferases, specifically the pentosyltransferases.  The systematic name of this enzyme class is UDP-D-xylose:zeatin O-beta-D-xylosyltransferase. Other names in common use include uridine diphosphoxylose-zeatin xylosyltransferase, and zeatin O-xylosyltransferase.

References

 

EC 2.4.2
Enzymes of unknown structure